Gomeyn (also known as Kamī, Kemi, Komī, and Kumsin) is a village in Kandovan Rural District, Kandovan District, Meyaneh County, East Azerbaijan Province, Iran. At the 2006 census, its population was 74, in 15 families.

References 

Populated places in Meyaneh County